Happiness is a 1957 Mexican drama film directed by Alfonso Corona Blake. It was entered into the 7th Berlin International Film Festival.

Cast
 Elsa Cárdenas
 Carlos López Moctezuma
 Gloria Lozano
 Armando Sáenz
 Fanny Schiller

References

External links

1957 films
1950s Spanish-language films
1957 drama films
Films directed by Alfonso Corona Blake
Mexican black-and-white films
Mexican drama films
1950s Mexican films